Kevin Frank Gross (born June 8, 1961) is a former Major League Baseball pitcher who played from 1983 through 1997.

Gross played for five different teams during his career: the Philadelphia Phillies (1983–1988), Montreal Expos (1989–1990), Los Angeles Dodgers (1991–1994), Texas Rangers (1995–1996), and Anaheim Angels (1997). He made his Major League Baseball debut on June 25, 1983, pitching  innings, surrendering 2 earned runs to the New York Mets en route to a 4–2 victory. He played his final game on July 25, 1997.

On August 10, 1987, Gross was caught ball scuffing; he had sandpaper in his glove, and he was suspended for 10 games. He was selected to the National League All-Star team in 1988. On August 17, 1992, as a member of the Los Angeles Dodgers, Gross threw a no-hitter versus their rivals, the San Francisco Giants, in a 2-0 victory.

On September 9, 1986, Gross surrendered the first of Rafael Palmeiro's 569 career home runs.

On May 14, 1990, pitching for the Expos in Los Angeles, Gross and Dodgers starter Fernando Valenzuela accomplished the rare feat of hitting homers off each other in the same inning.

As a hitter, Gross posted a .161 batting average (106-for-660) with 41 runs, 6 home runs, 36 RBI and 31 bases on balls.

In 2002, he was named to the Ventura County Sports Hall of Fame.

See also

 List of Major League Baseball no-hitters

References

External links

1961 births
Living people
American expatriate baseball players in Canada
Anaheim Angels players
Baseball players from California
Cal Lutheran Kingsmen baseball players
Los Angeles Dodgers players
Major League Baseball pitchers
Montreal Expos players
National League All-Stars
Oklahoma City 89ers players
Oxnard Condors baseball players
Philadelphia Phillies players
Portland Beavers players
Reading Phillies players
Spartanburg Phillies players
Sportspeople from Downey, California
Sportspeople from Ventura County, California
Texas Rangers players
Vancouver Canadians players